Samantha Fox Strip Poker  is a 1986 erotic video game developed by Software Communications and published by Martech. It was published on the Commodore 64, Amstrad CPC, BBC Micro, MSX, and ZX Spectrum.

It is one of the first erotic video games to include a real human being. It is part of a theme of erotic games where players complete difficult tasks and are rewarded with nudity.

Gameplay
The players plays 5-card or 7-card stud poker against British  model and singer Samantha Fox. Winning hands results in her taking off her clothes until she is topless.

Development
The video game was programmed by Wolfgang Smith, with the graphics edited by Malcolm Smith. The author of the music is Rob Hubbard, credited with the name John York. The music includes a cover of "The Entertainer" by Scott Joplin and "The Stripper" by David Rose.

Reception
ZZap!64 felt the music was well-suited to the style of game. Commodore Format magazine thought that the idea of anybody using the game as a way to experience titillating content was depressing due to the required amount of effort from the player. 

Uvejuegos thought the game was a prime example of how strange the 1980s were. Spiegel placed the game within the sub-genre of early pixelated digi-ladies of dubious beauty, along with Artworx's Strip Poker (1984).

References

External links
 World of Spectrum
 Happy Computer
 Tilt

1986 video games
Amstrad CPC games
BBC Micro and Acorn Electron games
Commodore 64 games
Erotic video games
MSX games
Video games developed in the United Kingdom
Video games scored by Rob Hubbard
ZX Spectrum games
Video games based on musicians
Martech games
Poker video games